Konstantinos Koukidis was the alleged Greek Evzone on flag guard duty on 27 April 1941 at the Athens Acropolis, at the beginning of the Axis occupation of Greece during World War II. After the first Germans climbed up the Acropolis, an officer ordered him to surrender, give up the Greek flag and raise the Nazi swastika flag in its place. Koukidis instead supposedly chose to stay loyal to his duty by hauling down the flag, wrapping it around his body and jumping from the Acropolis rock to his death. A commemorative plaque near the spot marks the event.

During a television programme on 26 April 2000, the then mayor of Athens Dimitris Avramopoulos, stated that there was no specific documentary evidence on Koukidis or his deed. It was noted that a heroic legend of this nature had been important in maintaining national morale under a harsh occupation. On the same occasion, Lieutenant General Ioannis Kakoudakis, Director of the Department of the History of the Army, reported that an investigation had failed to confirm the existence of this soldier. The Daily Mail original article about Koukidis in 1941 as well as relevant discussion is available online.

See also
Manolis Glezos and  Apostolos Santas who tore down the Nazi flag from the Acropolis in May 1941

References

Compare
Juan Escutia

1941 deaths
Greek military personnel killed in World War II
Greek military personnel who committed suicide
People whose existence is disputed
Place of birth missing
Suicides by jumping in Greece
Year of birth missing
Urban legends